Vexillum catenatum is a species of small sea snail, marine gastropod mollusk in the family Costellariidae, the ribbed miters.

Description
The length of the shell attains 10 mm.

The shell is white, with large irregular chestnut-brown spots, arranged in bands.

Distribution
This marine species occurs in the Indo-West Pacific, from Mauritius to Hawaii, Midway and Pitcairn Island; also off Australia.

References

 Nowell-Usticke, G. W. 1969. A supplementary listing of new shells (illustrated). To be added to the Check List of the marine shells of St. Croix. Burlington, Vermont: Lane Press. 32 pp., 6 pls
 Sarasúa H. (1978). Especies nuevas de Mitridae (Mollusca: Neogastropoda). Poeyana. 180 1–9.
 Turner H. (2001) Katalog der Familie Costellariidae Macdonald 1860 (Gastropoda: Prosobranchia: Muricoidea). Hackenheim: Conchbooks. 100 pp.

External links
 Broderip W.J. (1836 ["1835"]). Characters of new genera and species of the Mollusca and Conchifera, collected by Mr. Cuming [Shells of the genus Mitra, Lam., and one species of Conoelix, Swains., forming part of the collection of Mr. Cuming]. Proceedings of the Zoological Society of London. 3: 192-198
 Dautzenberg, P. & Bouge, L. J. (1923). Mitridés de la Nouvelle-Calédonie et de ses dépendances. Journal de Conchyliologie. 67(2): 83-159
  Rosenberg, G.; Moretzsohn, F.; García, E. F. (2009). Gastropoda (Mollusca) of the Gulf of Mexico, Pp. 579–699 in: Felder, D.L. and D.K. Camp (eds.), Gulf of Mexico–Origins, Waters, and Biota. Texas A&M Press, College Station, Texas.

catenatum
Gastropods described in 1836
Taxa named by William Broderip